Hugill Fell is a hill in the English Lake District, near Staveley, Cumbria, on the western side of the Kentmere valley.  It is the subject of a chapter of Wainwright's book The Outlying Fells of Lakeland. It reaches  and Wainwright's walk is an ascent from Staveley and return on the same route.  There is a cairn on the summit.

References

Fells of the Lake District